Maxim Ilyich Osipov (born August 31, 1993) is a Russian professional ice hockey defenceman. He is currently playing with Lokomotiv Yaroslavl of the Kontinental Hockey League (KHL).

Playing career
Osipov made his Kontinental Hockey League debut playing with Torpedo Nizhny Novgorod during the 2014–15 KHL season.

References

External links

1993 births
Living people
Lokomotiv Yaroslavl players
Russian ice hockey defencemen
Salavat Yulaev Ufa players
Torpedo Nizhny Novgorod players
Sportspeople from Yaroslavl